In music, extended technique is unconventional, unorthodox, or non-traditional methods of singing or of playing musical instruments employed to obtain unusual sounds or timbres.

Composers’ use of extended techniques is not specific to contemporary music (for instance, Hector Berlioz’s use of col legno in his Symphonie Fantastique is an extended technique) and it transcends compositional schools and styles. Extended techniques have also flourished in popular music. Nearly all jazz performers make significant use of extended techniques of one sort or another, particularly in more recent styles like free jazz or avant-garde jazz. Musicians in free improvisation have also made heavy use of extended techniques.

Examples of extended techniques include bowing under the bridge of a string instrument or with two different bows, using key clicks on a wind instrument, blowing and overblowing into a wind instrument without a mouthpiece, or inserting objects on top of the strings of a piano.

Twentieth-century exponents of extended techniques include Henry Cowell (use of fists and arms on the keyboard, playing inside the piano), John Cage (prepared piano), and George Crumb. The Kronos Quartet, which has been among the most active ensembles in promoting contemporary American works for string quartet, frequently plays music which stretches the manner in which sound can be drawn out of instruments.

Examples

Vocal 

 Sprechstimme (speech-singing)
 overtone singing (harmonic singing, or vocal multiphonics)
 ululation
 beatboxing (vocal percussionists)
 growling
 screaming and shouting
 whispering
 panting
 whistling
 hissing
 clucking
 barking
 sucking

Bowed string instruments 

 playing with a plectrum or pick
 playing with percussion sticks, mallets, or other objects
 bowing on the "wrong" side of the left hand fingers
 bowing behind the bridge
 bowing non-string parts of the instrument
 parallel rather than perpendicular bowing
 exaggerated vibrato
 snap pizzicato, also called Bartók pizzicato
 tapping or rubbing the soundboard of stringed instruments
 string scrapes with finger, nail, or object
 percussive effects on body of instrument
 tapping on the fingerboard
 "seagull" harmonic effects
 detuning a string while playing
 preparation
 resonance effects

Plucked string instruments 
 using a bow
 playing with percussion sticks, mallets, or other objects
 playing on crossed strings (called "snare drum effect" on guitar)
 snap pizzicato, in which a string is pulled away from the fingerboard until it snaps back and strikes the fingerboard.
 string scrapes, a technique especially associated with electric guitar and electric bass, as played with a pick.
 percussive effects, such as drumming on a string instrument body 
 palm and finger muting ("pizzicato")
 tapping on the fingerboard
 string pops and slaps (fingerboard instruments)
 preparation of a guitar by inserting screws or pieces of metal in the bridge or between the strings.
 detuning a string while playing
 "3rd bridge", a guitar technique using the part of the string between the nut and the stopping finger; see Xenakis' cello piece Nomos Alpha for a similar effect.

Piano 

 prepared piano, i.e., introducing foreign objects into the workings of the piano to change the sound quality
 string piano, i.e., striking, plucking, or bowing the strings directly, or any other direct manipulation of the strings
 resonance effects (whistling, singing or talking into the piano)
 silently depressing one or more keys, allowing the corresponding strings to vibrate freely, allowing sympathetic harmonics to sound
 touching the strings at node points to create harmonics
 percussive use of different parts of the piano, such as the outer rim
 slamming piano lid or keyboard cover
 microtones
 use of the palms, fists, or external devices to create tone clusters
 use of other materials to strike the keys
 pedal noises

Woodwind instruments 
 multiphonics
 harmonics
 pitch bends ("lipping")
 noisily activating keys without blowing
 combination of a mouthpiece of one instrument with the main body of another, for example, using an alto saxophone mouthpiece on a standard trombone.
 flutter-tonguing, 
 breath noises
 blowing a disengaged mouthpiece or reed
 singing through the instrument while playing
 internal muting
 key or tone-hole slap – percussive sound made by slapping a key or keys against their tone holes
 circular breathing

Brass instruments 
 singing through the instrument while playing
 exaggerated brass head-shakes
 noisily activating valves without blowing
 pitch bends ("lipping")
 combination of a mouthpiece of one instrument with the main body of another, for example, using a French horn mouthpiece on a standard bassoon
 flutter tonguing
 circular breathing
 double buzz
 half-valve playing
 unconventional mutes or other foreign objects in the bell (e.g. plumbing parts)
 breath noises
 slap tonguing
 blowing a disengaged mouthpiece

Percussion
 rudimental or "dynamic" double bass on the drum set, using hand rudiments such as double stroke rolls and flam taps and playing them with the feet
 stacking 2 or more cymbals, one on top of the other, to change the sound properties of the instrument
 bowed vibraphone, cymbals, and gongs
 resonance effects (e.g., cymbal played on a timpani; cow bell struck against a bass drum, etc.)
 pitch bends on mallet percussion
 harmonics
 custom-built percussion mallets, occasionally made for vibraphone or tubular bells (and other pitched-percussion in increasingly rare circumstances) which feature more than one mallet-head, and so are capable of producing multiple pitches and difficult chords (though usually only the chords they were designed to play). These mallets are seldom used, and percussionists sometimes make them themselves when they are needed. When implemented, they are usually only used once or twice in an entire work, and are alternated with conventional mallets; usually they are used only when playing a different instrument in each hand.
 striking a gong and then inserting the vibrating metal into a tub of water, creating a glissando.
 placing a cymbal on a timpani head

Electronic 
 added electronics or MIDI control
 Turntablism, such as scratching records or otherwise manipulating a record or turntable platter, often done in combination with a DJ mixer, to create unique sound effects and rhythms
 Using a "kill switch" on an electric guitar to create quasi-scratching rhythmic sounds.
 Circuit bending: DIY experimenting with electronic keyboards and electronic toys.
 playing electric instruments unplugged, or amplifying acoustical parts of normally electronic instruments (e.g. finger noise on the keys)
 exploitation of inherent equipment "defects" (e.g., deliberately driving digital equipment into aliasing; exaggerating hum or hiss coming from speakers, acoustic feedback, key click on a Hammond organ etc.)

Other instruments 

 unusual harmonics
 glissandi, tuner glissando

Notable composers 

 George Antheil
 Béla Bartók
 Bruno Bartolozzi
 Luciano Berio
 Hector Berlioz
 Heinrich Ignaz Franz Biber
 François-Adrien Boieldieu
 William Bolcom
 Pierre Boulez
 Glenn Branca
 Benjamin Britten
 Leo Brouwer
 John Cage
 Elliott Carter
 Aaron Cassidy
 Rhys Chatham
 Henry Cowell
 George Crumb
 Nicolas-Marie Dalayrac
 Peter Maxwell Davies
 Stuart Dempster
 Pascal Dusapin
 John Eaton
 Robert Erickson
 Julio Estrada
 Carlo Farina
 Morton Feldman
 Brian Ferneyhough
 Carlo Forlivesi
 Sofia Gubaidulina
 Jonathan Harvey
 Hans Werner Henze
 Dick Higgins
 Gustav Holst
 Toshio Hosokawa
 Alan Hovhaness
 Tobias Hume
 Charles Ives
 Ben Johnston
 Garth Knox
 Panayiotis Kokoras
 Nikita Koshkin
 Sophie Lacaze
 Helmut Lachenmann
 György Ligeti
 Gustav Mahler
 Eric Mandat
 Joseph Maneri
 Meredith Monk
 Ken Namba
 Luigi Nono
 Andrew Norman
 Pauline Oliveros
 Leo Ornstein
 Sean Osborn
 Owen Pallett
 Arvo Pärt
 Krzysztof Penderecki
 Gérard Pesson
 Sun Ra
 Lou Reed
 Doina Rotaru
 Christopher Rouse
 Kaija Saariaho
 Camille Saint-Saëns
 Giacinto Scelsi
 John Schneider
 Arnold Schoenberg
 Salvatore Sciarrino
 Stephen Scott
 Karlheinz Stockhausen
 Igor Stravinsky
 Toru Takemitsu
 Bertram Turetzky
 Ken Ueno
 Galina Ustvolskaya
 Franco Venturini
 Heitor Villa-Lobos
 Claude Vivier
 Carl Maria von Weber
 Jörg Widmann
 Iannis Xenakis
 La Monte Young
 Frank Zappa
 John Zorn

Notable performers

Bass 
 Bill Laswell
 Michael Manring
 Jaco Pastorius
 Mark Sandman
 Mike Silverman
 Bertram Turetzky

Bassoon 
 Yusef Lateef

Cello 
 Tom Cora
 Helen Liebmann
 Rohan de Saram
 Frances-Marie Uitti

Clarinet 
 Tara Bouman
 Walter Boeykens
 Guy Deplus
 Roberto Paci Dalò
 Eric Dolphy
 Eric Mandat
 Sean Osborn
 Michel Portal
 William O. Smith
 Suzanne Stephens
 Jörg Widmann
 Evan Ziporyn

Drums and percussion 
 Burkhard Beins
 Han Bennink
 John Bonham
 Bryan "Brain" Mantia
 Keith Moon
 Steve Noble
 Steven Schick
 Ruth Underwood

Flute 
 Ian Anderson
 Pierre-Yves Artaud
 Ian Clarke
 Robert Dick
 John Fonville
 Rahsaan Roland Kirk
 Kathinka Pasveer
 Maggi Payne
 Greg Pattillo

Guitar 

 Ichirou Agata
 Cristian Amigo
 Derek Bailey
 Syd Barrett
 Adrian Belew
 Buckethead
 Herman Li
 Nels Cline
 Roland Dyens
 Dominic Frasca
 Fred Frith
 Synyster Gates
 Jonny Greenwood
 GP Hall
 Michael Hedges
 Jimi Hendrix
 Evan Hirschelman
 Martín Irigoyen
 Enver İzmaylov
 Jonsi
 Kaki King
 Uwe Kropinski
 Arto Lindsay
 Andy McKee
 Erik Mongrain
 Thurston Moore
 Tom Morello
 Jimmy Page
 Štěpán Rak
 Lee Ranaldo
 Preston Reed
 Marc Ribot
 Keith Rowe
 Joe Satriani
 Nigel Tufnel
 Steve Vai

Harp 
 Carlos Salzedo
 Marianne Smit

Horn 
 David Amram
 Hermann Baumann
 Anthony Halstead
 Giovanni Punto
 David Pyatt
 Barry Tuckwell

Oboe 
 Heinz Holliger
 Yusef Lateef

Piano 
 George Antheil
 Henry Cowell
 Richard Bunger Evans
 Alan Hovhaness
 Leo Ornstein
 David Tudor
 Galina Ustvolskaya
 Franco Venturini
 Claude Vivier

Saxophone 
 Peter Brötzmann
 Ornette Coleman
 Mats Gustafsson
 Rahsaan Roland Kirk
 Sam Newsome
 Evan Parker
 Ned Rothenberg
 Skerik
 Colin Stetson
 John Zorn
 Pharoah Sanders
 Anthony Braxton
 John Coltrane

Trombone 
 Stuart Dempster
 Vinko Globokar
 John Kenny
 George E. Lewis
 Christian Lindberg
 Paul Rutherford
Mike Svoboda
Abbie Conant
Dan Blackberg

Tuba 
 Øystein Baadsvik
Robin Hayward
Dan Peck

Trumpet 
 Miles Davis
 Jon Hassell
 Håkan Hardenberger
Peter Evans
Nate Wooley

Viola 
 John Cale
 Garth Knox
 Anne Lanzilotti
 Ysanne Spevack

Violin 
 Alexander Balanescu
 Tony Conrad
 Graeme Jennings
 Niccolò Paganini
 Michael Urbaniak
 Paul Zukofsky

Voice 

 Blixa Bargeld
 Cathy Berberian
 Jaap Blonk
 Brian Chippendale
 Collegium Vocale Köln
 George Fisher
 Diamanda Galás
 Peter Hammill
 Roy Hart
 Shelley Hirsch
 Joan La Barbara
 Bobby McFerrin
 Meredith Monk
 David Moss
 Sainkho Namtchylak
 Mike Patton
 Maja Ratkje
 Demetrio Stratos
 Tanya Tagaq
 Kazuki Tomokawa 
 Ken Ueno
 Michael Vetter
 Trevor Wishart

Other
 Bradford Reed

See also 

 List of notable pieces which use extended techniques

References

Further reading 
 Bruno Bartolozzi; New Sounds for Woodwind, second edition, translated by Reginald Smith Brindle. London and New York: Oxford University Press, 1982. .
 Stuart Dempster; The Modern Trombone: A Definition of Its Idioms, The New Instrumentation 3. Berkeley and Los Angeles: University of California Press, 1979. .
 Michael Edward Edgerton; The 21st-Century Voice. The New Instrumentation 9. Lanham, Maryland: Scarecrow Press, 2004. .
 Douglas Hill. Extended Techniques for the Horn: A Practical Handbook for Students, Performers and Composers. [S.l.]: Alfred Music Publishing, 1996. .
 Evan Hirschelman; Acoustic Artistry: Tapping, Slapping, and Percussion Techniques for Classical and Fingerstyle Guitar. Private Lessons (Musicians Institute). Milwaukee: Musicians Institute Press/Hal Leonard, 2011. .
 Linda L. Holland and Evan Conlee. Easing into Extended Technique, 5 vols. [Ridgefield, Wash.]: Con Brio, 1999.
 Thomas Howell; The Avant-Garde Flute: A Handbook for Composers and Flutists. The New Instrumentation 2. Berkeley and Los Angeles: University of California Press, 1974. .
 Ruth Inglefield and Lou Ann Neill; Writing for the Pedal Harp: A Standardized Manual for Composers and Harpists. The New Instrumentation 6. Berkeley and Los Angeles: University of California Press, 1985. .
 J. Michael Leonard; Extended Technique for the Saxophone. Wayland, MA : Black Lion Press, 2004.
 Gardner Read; Contemporary Instrumental Techniques. New York: Schirmer Books, 1976. .
 Gardner Read; A Thesaurus of Orchestral Devices. New York: Greenwood Press, 1969. .
 Philip Rehfeldt; New Directions for Clarinet, revised edition. The New Instrumentation 4. Berkeley and Los Angeles: University of California Press, 1994. . Reprinted, Lanham, MD: The Scarecrow Press, 2013.
 Jamie Leigh Sampson; Contemporary Techniques for the Bassoon:  Multiphonics. Bowling Green, OH: ADJ·ective New Music, LLC, 2014. .
 John Schneider; The Contemporary Guitar, revised and enlarged edition. Lanham, Maryland: Rowman & Littlefield, 2015. .
 Reginald Smith Brindle; Contemporary Percussion. London and New York: Oxford University Press, 1991. .
 Patricia and Allen Strange; The Contemporary Violin.  The New Instrumentation 7. Berkeley and Los Angeles: University of California Press, 2001. .
 Bertram Turetzky; The Contemporary Contrabass, new and revised edition. The New Instrumentation 1. Berkeley and Los Angeles: University of California Press, 1989. .

External links 
 Shaken Not Stuttered by Anne Lanzilotti. Extended techniques for strings. Includes masterclass videos and notation suggestions.
 Cello Map by Ellen Fallowfield
 Woodwind Fingering charts
 New Sounds for Flute by Mats Möller
 Guide How to Prepare a Guitar on hypercustom.com
 The Orchestra: A User's Manual by Andrew Hugill with The Philharmonia Orchestra.  Includes definitions, descriptions and video interviews of extended techniques for most all common orchestral instruments.
 oddmusic A website dedicated to unique, odd, ethnic, experimental and unusual musical instruments and resources.

 
Musical performance techniques
Contemporary classical music
20th-century classical music